AF Elbasani, is a football club based in Elbasan, Albania. The club plays in the Kategoria e Dytë, which is the third tier of football in the country.

History
In 2021, the club was formed by the Elbasan Municipality after the disaggrements with businessman Arben Laze who was the owner of the first football club KF Elbasani. Due to financial bankruptcy KF Elbasani was seized by the Directorate of Taxes in Elbasan. So with the initiative of the fans they found the way and with the cooperation of Elbasan Municipality AF Elbasani was created.   In the 2021–2022 season, they competed in the fourth tier of Albanian football Kategoria e Tretë. In their first season, they achieved first place, gaining promotion to Kategoria e Dytë.

Players

Current squad

Honours

League titles
 Kategoria e Tretë
 Champions (1): 2021

References

Association football clubs established in 1913
AF Elbasani
Football in Elbasan
1913 establishments in Albania
Albanian Third Division clubs